Aubrey Kachingwe (born 1926) is a Malawian novelist and short-story writer. He was educated in Malawi and Tanzania. He is "famed for being the first Malawian writer to publish with the prestigious African Writers Series (arguably the most significant publisher of African Literature in English).. he published a political novel, No Easy Task, in 1966 just four years after African Writers Series was launched." It was his first and only novel. He has written many short stories published in local and international papers and magazines.

References

1926 births
Living people
Malawian novelists
Malawian short story writers
20th-century novelists
20th-century short story writers